Voicemail is a centralized system of managing telephone messages.

Voicemail or Voice Mail may also refer to:

Voice Mail (album), an album by John Wetton
Voice Mail (band), a dancehall reggae trio
Audio letter sending recordings by postal mail
Voicemail, a song by Antarctigo Vespucci